Around the start of the Common Era, the family trees of the gens Julia and the gens Claudia became intertwined into the Julio-Claudian family tree as a result of marriages and adoptions.

Descendancy of the emperors of the Julio-Claudian dynasty

The Julio-Claudian dynasty was the first dynasty of Roman emperors. All emperors of that dynasty descended from Julii Caesares and/or from Claudii. Marriages between descendants of Sextus Julius Caesar and Claudii had occurred from the late stages of the Roman Republic, but the intertwined Julio-Claudian family tree resulted mostly from adoptions and marriages in Imperial Rome's first decades. Note that descendancy of the Julii Caesares before the generation of Julius Caesar's grandfather is in part conjectural, but as presented by scholars.

|-
|style="text-align: left;"|

Simplified

By generation
In the Julio-Claudian dynasty of Roman emperors, the lineage of the Julii Caesares was separated from those of the Claudii up to Augustus' generation. The next generation had both Claudii with a Julia as ancestor, as Claudii adopted into the Julii Caesares family. After Tiberius, the remaining three emperors of the dynasty had, outside adoptions, ancestors in both the Julian and the Claudian families.

Generation of Julius Caesar's grandfather
Gaius Julius Caesar II and Lucius Julius Caesar II may have had Sextus Julius Caesar, the military tribune of 181 BC, as a common ancestor.

Generation of Julius Caesar's father
This generation of Julii Caesares has two consuls: Sextus Julius Caesar in 91 BC, and Lucius Julius Caesar the next year. This generation has also two female descendants very close to the centers of power by their marriages: Julia, the daughter of Gaius Julius Caesar II was married to seven-times consul Gaius Marius, while Julia, the daughter of Lucius Julius Caesar II was married to the two-times consul and Roman dictator Lucius Cornelius Sulla, who had successfully challenged Marius' power. For ensuing generations, Gaius Julius Caesar (proconsul of Asia), married to a consul's daughter, and Lucius Julius Caesar proved to be quintessential ancestors of those who held Imperial power in the Julio-Claudian dynasty.

Julius Caesar's generation
Following Sulla's example Julius Caesar's and Pompey's first marriages were with women of their own generation, later marrying women of a younger generation. After being betrothed to Cossutia, Julius Caesar's first wife was Cornelia, the mother of Julia. The younger of Caesar's two sisters married Marcus Atius Balbus: they were ancestors of all the Julio-Claudian emperors, apart from Tiberius.

This is also the generation of Mark Antony's parents. Mark Antony's mother Julia was the daughter of Lucius Julius Caesar: she was an ancestor of the last three emperors of the Julio-Claudian dynasty.

Generation of Julius Caesar's daughter
By this time marriages with a political agenda among the powerful families were in full swing, however not yet between Julii Caesares and Claudii. Pompey married Julius Caesar's daughter Julia. Julius Caesar's second wife Pompeia, possibly a great-granddaughter of Lucius Julius Caesar II, was a granddaughter of Sulla. His third wife Calpurnia is said to be younger than his daughter. His son Caesarion resulted from his relation with Cleopatra.

Atia, the daughter of Julius Caesar's sister, married Gaius Octavius: they became the parents of the first emperor of the Julio-Claudian dynasty, then still called Octavianus. Their daughter Octavia the Younger became an ancestor to the last three emperors of that dynasty. In this generation Mark Antony had children by, among others, Antonia Hybrida Minor, and Fulvia.

Generation of the Octavias
The Claudii were a powerful gens with consuls and other high ranking politicians in several of its families across several generations. In this generation the first marriages between Claudii and descendants of the Julii Caesares took place. This however didn't mean yet that the dynastic family trees of both gentes got merged into a single one: that didn't happen until the adoption of Claudii by (adopted) Julii Caesares in the generations to come.

Octavia the Younger's first husband was a Claudius from the Marcelli family. Claudia, descending from Claudii, became the first wife of Octavian, who by then was adopted in the Julii Caesares family by the testament of his uncle Julius Caesar. After her first husband's death, Octavia married Mark Antony, who besides the offspring of his first three marriages had had children by Cleopatra.

Augustus daughter Julia the Elder's first marriage was to Marcus Vipsanius Agrippa; their daughter Julia the Younger married Lucius Aemilius Paullus; their youngest child was Junia Lepida married to Gaius Cassius Longinus (consul AD 30). Junia and Gaius granddaughter Domitia Longina married twice: 1) Lucius Aelius Lamia Plautius Aelianus and 2) Emperor  Domitian of the Flavian dynasty. Issue from Domitia Longina first marriage was Lucius Fundanius Lamia Aelianus and Plautia, their children married into the Antonine dynasty.

Antonia Major's generation
Octavianus, becoming Augustus the first Roman emperor, married Scribonia who gave him a daughter (Julia the Elder). His last marriage was with Livia, a Claudia who had been married to a Claudius. Their son Tiberius, by birth a Claudius, was later adopted by Augustus, thus, like his stepfather Augustus, becoming one of the Julii Caesares by adoption.

Antonia Minor's generation
Antonia Minor's husband Nero Claudius Drusus, a.k.a. Drusus the Elder, was a Claudian like his brother emperor Tiberius: they were the sons of Tiberius Claudius Nero, the praetor of 42 BC.

Agrippina the Elder's generation
Without son, Augustus had adopted his grandsons (by his only daughter Julia) Gaius, Lucius and Postumus, and his stepson Tiberius, in order to ensure an heir and successor. Around the time of his death only Tiberius remained and he became the next emperor. Tiberius, a Claudius by birth had become one of the Julii Caesares by adoption: from this moment this first dynasty of Roman emperors was both Julian and Claudian. The further emperors of this dynasty had both Julian and Claudian ancestors.

Agrippina the Younger's generation
Caligula was the last emperor adopted into the family of the Julii Caesares. He was a Claudius by descendance, although he had Julii Caesares among his ancestors, from both his mother's and his father's side.

Most marriages remained childless and many potential successors in the dynasty were eliminated after rampant accusations.

Claudius, the fourth emperor of the Julio-Claudian dynasty, was a brother to Caligula's father Germanicus. He belonged to the gens Claudia with, from his mother's side, Julian ancestors.

Poppaea Sabina's generation
Nero, the last emperor of the dynasty, was by birth a Domitius with as well Julian ancestors (from both his mother's as his father's side), as Claudian (from his mother's side). He became a Claudian himself, by adoption by his stepfather emperor Claudius, a brother to his grandfather from his mother's side, or, from his father's side, a son of his grandmother's sister.

Citations

General and cited sources 

 Miriam Griffin. A Companion to Julius Caesar, p. 13 ff. John Wiley & Sons, 2009. . (Julius Caesar's descendancy.)
 Antony Kamm. Julius Caesar: A Life, pp. 156 (Genealogical chart of the family of Julius Caesar) and 157 (Simplified genealogical chart of the emperors from Augustus to Nero). Routledge, 2006. .
 J. W. Meijer (translator). Tacitus: Jaarboeken (Ab excessu divi Augusti Annales). Ambo, 1990.   – pp. 511 (Julia the Elder's family tree), 532 (Tiberius' family tree), 576–577 (from Gaius Julius Caesar the Elder to Nero)
 Napoleon III. Histoire de Jules César Volume 1, p. 253. Paris: H. Plon 1865. (Julius Caesar's family tree.)
 William Smith. Dictionary of Greek and Roman Biography and Mythology. 1870. Volume 1 p. 536 ff. (Julii Caesares up to the generation before the adoptions started.)
 John S. Wurts. Magna Charta. Brookfield Publishing Company, 1945. Vol. 4 p. 627. (Ordinals for the Julii Caesares with the same praenomen.)

External links
 Sextus Julius I Caesar Proconsul of Sicily (and subsequent pages) at 
 "The Stemma of the Julio-Claudian Emperors" by R. Scott Moore at 

-
Ancient Roman family trees